The BBC broadcasts all of the BBC One and BBC Two regional variations on digital satellite television from the SES Astra satellites at 28.2° east; providing local news programmes and other regional programming with local continuity and presentation for Northern Ireland, Scotland and Wales. The BBC refers to the whole UK regional network as "BBC Nations and Regions".

The local version of BBC One is normally on channel 101, with BBC Two on channel 102.  On Freesat equipment, users enter a postcode during initial set up—this determines the assigned local version. On Sky equipment, the address to which the viewing card was issued determines the correct local version—without any viewing card the London versions are shown by default. All other national and regional versions are shown in the EPG.

History
From the launch of digital satellite on 1 October 1998 until 31 March 2001, there were four variants (England, Scotland, Wales and Northern Ireland) of both BBC One and BBC Choice carried on all digital platforms. Only one version of BBC Two was available digitally, and this was shown throughout the UK. The BBC English Regions gradually became available via Digital Terrestrial Television (Freeview) over the next few years, as did the national versions of BBC Two. 

On digital satellite television, regional news programmes on BBC One were replaced by UK Today until 28 January 2002 when additional transponder space was allocated to the English regions. Initially programmes were available as an interactive service via the red button and only for the five largest English regions; London, North West, South, West Midlands and Yorkshire On 30 May 2003 the BBC stopped encrypting its TV channels on digital satellite and made all regions available as standard, full-time channels.

BBC regional services and channel numbers

BBC One
Regional news inserts are broadcast during BBC Breakfast along with 15-minute shows on weekdays after national news bulletins at 1.30 pm and 10.30 pm, along with a 30-minute show at 6.30 pm. On weekends the availability of a regional news bulletin following the national news depends on the timeslot.

In England—other than regional news programmes—regional opt-outs include the documentary strand Inside Out, a regional segment of Sunday Politics and in the northern regions (those based in Hull, Leeds, Manchester and Newcastle) The Super League Show.

Elsewhere, additional local programming is broadcast; (notable examples include Give My Head Peace and Spotlight in Northern Ireland, River City and Sportscene in Scotland and Belonging and Crash in Wales) with network programmes rescheduled to accommodate them.

BBC One HD started broadcasting on 3 November 2010. There are currently four regional variations – a network variant for England, a Northern Ireland variant that launched on 24 October 2012, a Scottish variation that launched on 14 January 2013 and a Welsh variation that launched on 29 January 2013.

BBC Two
Three regional variations of BBC Two exist – Northern Ireland, Wales and a network variant covering the rest of the UK. Each variant is also available in high-definition, although due to capacity issues the Northern Ireland variant is not available on satellite. A variation for Scotland was available until 2019 when it was replaced by BBC Scotland.

References

External links
 BBC digital TV and radio – satellite frequencies
 BBC digital TV and radio on Virgin Media cable

BBC Regional News shows
Satellite television